is a 1979 Japanese film directed by Noboru Nakamura. Produced by Masaichi Nagata　Based on Matsutarō Kawaguchi's novel. The film chronicles the life of Japanese Buddhist monk of the Kamakura period, Nichiren. Nichiren is the final film Noboru Nakamura directed.

Cast

 Kinnosuke Yorozuya : Nichiren
 Kyoko Kishida : Mother of Nichiren
 Takahiro Tamura : Father of Nichiren
 Katsuo Nakamura : Nisshō
 Toshiyuki Nagashima : Nikkō Shōnin
 Kō Nishimura : Abutsu
 Harue Akagi : Wife of  Abutsu
 Shinsuke Mikimoto : Nanbu Sanenaga
 Hideo Kanze : Hiki Yoshimoto
 Kunie Tanaka : Gyōdō 
 Shinjirō Ehara : Kudo Yoshitaka
 Keiko Matsuzaka : Wife of Kudo Yoshitaka
 Tetsuro Tamba : Nichijō  
 Yoko Nogiwa : Wife of Nichijō
 Goro Ibuki : Shijo Kingo
 Asao Koike : Tōjō Kagenobu
 Rinichi Yamamoto : Ichi Shigenao
 Takeshi Kato : Yozaburō
 Kimiko Ikegami : Daughter of Yozaburō
 Kanjūrō Arashi : Shogaki
 Hideji Ōtaki :  Dōzen
 Sakae Umezu : Ninshō
 Asao Sano : Yadoya Mitsunori
 Akiji Kobayashi : Lanxi Daolong
 Ichirō Nakatani : Taira no Yoritsuna
 Ryosuke Kagawa : Hōjō Masamura
 Hiroki Matsukata : Hōjō Tokimune
 Ichikawa Somegorō VI : Hōjō Tokiyori

See also
Nichiren to Mōko Daishūrai The film was also produced by Masaichi Nagata in 1958.

References

External links
 

Jidaigeki films
1970s Japanese films